Richwood is an unincorporated community in Boone County, in the U.S. state of Kentucky.

History
A post office called Richwood was established in 1859, and remained in operation until 1918. The community may have the name of the local Rich family.

References

Unincorporated communities in Boone County, Kentucky
Unincorporated communities in Kentucky